Marius Kleinsorge (born 30 October 1995) is a German professional footballer who plays as a forward for SV Meppen.

Club career
Kleinsorge moved to 1. FC Kaiserslautern from SV Meppen in summer 2020. On 3 January 2022, he joined Rot-Weiss Essen on loan until the end of the 2021–22 season.

In July 2022 Kleinsorge returned to former club SV Meppen, having agreed a three-year contract.

References

1995 births
Living people
People from Goslar
German footballers
Footballers from Lower Saxony
Association football forwards
Goslarer SC 08 players
SV Wehen Wiesbaden players
SV Meppen players
1. FC Kaiserslautern players
1. FC Kaiserslautern II players
Rot-Weiss Essen players
3. Liga players
Regionalliga players